Kicking and Screaming is a 1995 American comedy-drama film written and directed by Noah Baumbach in his feature directorial debut. It tells of a group of college graduates who refuse to move on with their lives, each in their own peculiar way. The film stars Josh Hamilton, Chris Eigeman, Carlos Jacott, and features Eric Stoltz, Olivia d'Abo and Parker Posey.

Cast

 Josh Hamilton as Grover
 Olivia d'Abo as Jane
 Chris Eigeman as Max Belmont
 Parker Posey as Miami
 Jason Wiles as Skippy
 Cara Buono as Kate
 Carlos Jacott as Otis
 Elliott Gould as Grover's Dad
 Eric Stoltz as Chet
 Marissa Ribisi as Charlotte
 Dean Cameron as Zach
 Perrey Reeves as Amy
 Noah Baumbach as Danny
 Jessica Hecht as Ticket Woman

Production
Much of the film was shot at Occidental College.

Jason Blum, Baumbach's college roommate who was producing a film for the first time, obtained financing after receiving a letter from family acquaintance Steve Martin endorsing the script. Blum attached the letter to copies of the script he sent around Hollywood.

Reception and legacy
Kicking and Screaming received mostly positive reviews, with many critical assessments describing it as remarkably competent for a directorial and writing debut, expecting that Baumbach would "graduate to better things." On review aggregation website Rotten Tomatoes, the film holds an approval rating of 57% based on 37 reviews, with an average rating of 5.5/10. The site's critics consensus reads: "Witty and watchable yet undeniably flawed, Kicking and Screaming marks writer-director Noah Baumbach as an emerging talent with intriguing potential." On Metacritic, which assigns a normalized rating to reviews, the film has a weighted average score of 75 out of 100, based on 18 critics, indicating "generally favorable reviews".

Roger Ebert praised the film's "good eye and a terrific ear; the dialogue by writer-director Noah Baumbach is not simply accurate... but a distillation of reality–elevating aimless brainy small-talk into a statement." Reviews often mentioned the thin and meandering plot, but most noted this as a facet of the characters' life stage. Janet Maslin of The New York Times stated, "Kicking and Screaming occupies its postage-stamp size terrain with confident comic style."

According to Kevin Thomas of the Los Angeles Times, "You begin to wonder why you're bothering to watch the aimless lives of these four unfold... At 25 he may be too close to the material to achieve the detachment from which irony and meaning flow." In a 2020 retrospective article, Nathan Dunne of The Guardian wrote the film is "a charming distillation of 90s slacker posturing and the tedium of a quarter-life crisis."

The film premiered in 1995 at the New York Film Festival to critical acclaim. Baumbach was chosen as one of Newsweeks "Ten New Faces of 1996". The Criterion Collection released the film on DVD on August 22, 2006 in the U.S.

References

External links

 
 
 
Reasons for Kicking and Screaming an essay by Jonathan Rosenbaum at the Criterion Collection
Kicking and Screaming on MUBI

1995 films
American romantic comedy-drama films
1995 directorial debut films
1995 independent films
1990s romantic comedy-drama films
Films directed by Noah Baumbach
Films set in universities and colleges
Trimark Pictures films
1995 comedy films
1990s English-language films
1990s American films